Charles Peterson may refer to:

 Charles A. Peterson (1884–1953), American politician
 Charles E. Peterson (1906–2004), American architect and proponent of historic preservation
 Charles E. Peterson (coach) (1889–1959), American football and basketball coach and college dean
 Charles Gilbert Peterson (1848–1918), American contractor and former Mayor of Lockport, NY
 Charles Jacobs Peterson (1818–1887), American author and publisher
 Charles L. Peterson (born 1927), American artist
 Charles Peterson (philatelist) (1933–2009), American philatelist
 Charles Peterson (photographer) (born 1964), American photographer 
 Charles S. Peterson (1927–2017), American historian
 Charles Sreeve Peterson (1818–1889), early Mormon leader and first settler of Utah's Morgan Valley
Charles Bowne Peterson or Chip Peterson (born 1987), American swimmer

See also
Charles Petersen (1902–1979), Danish Olympic boxer